Gadhada is one of the 182 Legislative Assembly constituencies of Gujarat state in India. It is part of Botad district and is reserved for candidates belonging to the Scheduled Castes.

List of segments 
This assembly seat represents the following segments,

 Gadhada Taluka (part) Villages – Anida, Ankadiya, Bhandariya, Bodki, Chabhadiya, Chiroda, Chosla, Dhasa, Gadhada (M), Gadhali, Ghogha Samdi, Gundala, Sanjanavadar, Haripar, Ingorala, Itariya, Jalalpur, Junavadar, Kamparadi, Kerala (Gadhada), Khijadiya, Khopala, Limbadiya, Limbala, Limbali, Malpara, Mandavdhar, Mandva, Mota Umarda, Moti Kundal, Nana Umarda, Padapan, Padvadar, Patana, Pipardi, Rajpipala, Raliyana, Rampara, Rasnal, Rojmal, Samadhiyala, Sitapar, Vanali, Vavdi, Vikaliya, Viravadi, Virdi.
 Umrala Taluka
Vallabhipur Taluka.

Members of Legislative Assembly 
1967- Darbar saheb Ranjeetsinhji B Gohil, Swatantra party
1972- Lakhman Goti, Indian National Congress
1975- Pratap Shah, Indian National Congress
1980- Bachu Gohel, Indian National Congress
 1985- Kanti Gohil, Indian National Congress
 1990- Maganlal Ranva, Bharatiya Janata Party
1995- Atmaram Parmar, Bharatiya Janata Party
1998- Atmaram Parmar, Bharatiya Janata Party
2002- Pravin Maru, Indian National Congress
2007 - Atmaram Parmar, Bharatiya Janata Party
2012 - Atmaram Parmar, Bharatiya Janata Party

Election results

2022 
 

-->

2020

2017

2012

See also
 List of constituencies of the Gujarat Legislative Assembly
 Botad district

References

External links
 

Assembly constituencies of Gujarat
Botad district